La Voz De La Juventud is the third studio album by Urban Bachata artist Toby Love released in 2011 through Sony Music Latin.

Track listing

Charts

References

Toby Love albums
2011 albums
Spanish-language albums